King Pu-tsung (born 30 August 1956 in Tainan, Taiwan) is a Taiwanese politician. He served as the Secretary-General of the National Security Council from 25 March 2014 until 12 February 2015. King was widely regarded as the most important aide to Ma Ying-jeou. He served as the Secretary-General of Kuomintang (KMT) from December 2009 to January 2011. King also served as Vice Mayor of Taipei from 2002 to 2006 and had previously been a scholar and journalist. King is alleged to be a descendant of the Aisin Gioro clan.

Early life
King earned his bachelor's degree in journalism from Chinese National Chengchi University, then studied abroad to earn a master's degree in mass communications from Texas Tech University and a Ph.D. in journalism from the University of Texas, Austin in United States.

Early career
King had taught at National Chengchi University. He also had taught at the Chinese University of Hong Kong in Hong Kong.

KMT Secretary-General
As Secretary-General, King pledged to sort out financial questions of national funds that had been mixed with party assets, and urged party members to provide more than "lip service" to support party candidates in the run-up to the mayoral elections at the end of 2010.

Personal life
King is alleged to be related to the last Qing emperor Puyi, although lack of genealogical evidence has raised suspicions. Were his relation to the imperial family true, he would also be the cousin of Puru and his surname King a sinified adoption of the Qing imperial clan name Aisin Gioro.

See also
 Taipei Economic and Cultural Representative Office
 Manchu people in Taiwan

References

Living people
1956 births
Taiwanese people of Manchu descent
Politicians of the Republic of China on Taiwan from Tainan
Kuomintang politicians in Taiwan
Taiwanese educators
Aisin Gioro
Manchu politicians
National Chengchi University alumni
Texas Tech University alumni
Moody College of Communication alumni
Chinese University of Hong Kong people
Deputy mayors of Taipei
Representatives of Taiwan to the United States